Veronica Rose Gajownik (born August 4, 1993) is a former American softball and baseball player, and an American baseball manager. She was a member of the United States women's national baseball team which won a gold medal at the 2015 Pan American Games. In 2023 she was named the Hillsboro Hops’ manager for the 2023 season; this made her the first woman to manage a High-A team, and the first openly LGBTQ manager in minor or major league baseball history.

Biography 
Veronica Gajownik was born in Winter Park, Florida, on August 4, 1993. She is the daughter of Marcel Gajownik and Glenn Richards, a chief meteorologist for WOFL. Veronica was introduced to baseball by her father and started to play baseball with boys in Oviedo recreation leagues.

Gajownik started playing softball when she attended Paul J. Hagerty High School in Oviedo, Florida. She played for the Hagerty Huskies and has a .531 batting average as a junior with a .694 on-base percentage. She also competed in summer competitions for Team North Florida, the Tampa Mustangs and Team Florida.

Gajownik attended Indian River State College in 2013 and University of South Florida during 2014–2015 where she played softball for the South Florida Bulls.

Gajownik joined the Arizona Diamondbacks organization as a video assistant with the Hillsboro Hops, their High-A affiliate, in 2021. In 2022, Gajownik served as a coach for the Amarillo Sod Poodles of the Double-A Texas League and for the Salt River Rafters of the Arizona Fall League. In 2023 she was named Hillsboro's manager for the 2023 season; this made her the first woman to manage a High-A team, and the first openly LGBTQ manager in minor or major league baseball history. She is married to a woman.

References

External links 
 Veronica Gajownik on Team USA

1993 births
Living people
American female baseball players
Baseball players from Florida
Baseball infielders
South Florida Bulls softball players
Indian River State Pioneers softball players
Pan American Games gold medalists for the United States
Pan American Games medalists in baseball
Baseball players at the 2015 Pan American Games
Sportspeople from Winter Park, Florida
Softball players from Florida
Medalists at the 2015 Pan American Games